The 2008–09 Drexel Dragons men's basketball team represented Drexel University during the 2008–09 NCAA Division I men's basketball season. The Dragons, led by 8th year head coach Bruiser Flint, played their home games at the Daskalakis Athletic Center and were members of the Colonial Athletic Association.

Roster

Schedule

|-
!colspan=8 style="background:#F8B800; color:#002663;"| Regular season
|-

|-
!colspan=8 style="background:#F8B800; color:#002663;"| CAA tournament

Awards
Bruiser Flint
CAA Coach Of The Year

Samme Givens
CAA All-Rookie Team
CAA Rookie of the Week

Tramayne Hawthorne
CAA Player of the Week

Scott Rodgers
CAA All-Conference Second Team
CAA All-Defensive Team
CAA Player of the Week

Leon Spencer
CAA Player of the Week
CAA All-Academic Second Team

References

Drexel Dragons men's basketball seasons
Drexel
Drexel
Drexel